Aviatorilor (Aviators′ in English) is a metro station in Bucharest. It is located at the end of Aviatorilor Boulevard, under Charles de Gaulle Square. It provides easy access to Herăstrău Park and the headquarters of the national television network, TVR.

The station was opened on 24 October 1987 as part of the extension from Piața Unirii to Pipera.
There are plans to add a permanent exhibition to the platform, celebrating the life of Romanian World War II fighter ace Captain Horia Agarici.

References

Bucharest Metro stations
Railway stations opened in 1987
1987 establishments in Romania